Joe De Medici (28 May 1920 – 12 February 1980) was  a former Australian rules footballer who played with Footscray and South Melbourne in the Victorian Football League (VFL).

Notes

External links 		
		
		
		
		
		
		
		
1920 births		
1980 deaths		
Australian rules footballers from Victoria (Australia)		
Western Bulldogs players		
Sydney Swans players